Miguel Albaladejo (Pilar de la Horadada, Alicante, 20 August 1966) is a Spanish screenwriter and film director.

Filmography as film director
 The First Night of My Life (1998), made for 2000, Seen By... 
 Manolito Gafotas  (1999)
 Ataque verbal (1999)
 Rencor (2001)
 El cielo abierto (2001)
 Cachorro (2004)
 Volando voy (2006)

References

External links
 

1966 births
Living people
People from Vega Baja del Segura
Spanish film directors
Film directors from the Valencian Community
Spanish male screenwriters
Spanish male writers